Katakwi General Hospital, also Katakwi Hospital is a government-owned hospital in the Eastern Region of Uganda.

Location
The hospital is located in the central business district of the town of Katakwi, in Katakwi District, in the Teso sub-region, in Uganda's Eastern Region.

The coordinates of Katakwi General Hospital are: 01°55'03.0"N, 33°57'44.0"E (Latitude:1.917511; Longitude:33.962214).

Overview
Katakwi General Hospital was established in 2004, as Katakwi Health Centre IV. In 2011, it was elevated to a full fledged hospital, serving patients from Katakwi District and the neighboring districts of Amuria, Kapelebyong, Kumi, Nakapiripirit and Napak. Like many government hospitals in Uganda, the hospital is understaffed and underfunded.

See also
List of hospitals in Uganda

References

External links
 Website of Uganda Ministry of Health

Hospitals in Uganda
Katakwi District
Teso sub-region
2011 establishments in Uganda
Hospital buildings completed in 2004